Nejat Tümer (1924, Istanbul – 29 May 2011) was a Turkish admiral.  He was Commander of the Turkish Naval Forces from 1980 to 1983. He was one of the five leaders of the 1980 military coup, and after the coup he was a member of the Presidential Council.

References 

1924 births
Military personnel from Istanbul
2011 deaths
Commanders of the Turkish Naval Forces